Hisham II or Abu'l-Walid Hisham II al-Mu'ayyad bi-llah (Abū'l-Walīd Hishām al-Muʾayyad bi-ʾllāh) (son of Al-Hakam II and Subh of Cordoba) was the third Umayyad Caliph of Spain, in Al-Andalus from 976 to 1009, and 1010–13.

Reign 

In 976, at the age of 11, Hisham II succeeded his father Al-Hakam II as Caliph of Cordoba. Hisham II was a minor at the time of his accession and therefore was unfit to rule. In order to benefit the Caliphate, his mother Subh was aided by first minister Jafar al-Mushafi to act as regents with al-Mansur ibn Abi Aamir (better known as "Almanzor") as her steward. In 978 Almanzor manipulated his way into the position of royal chamberlain. In an attempt to position himself as a prospective ruler of the Caliphate, Almanzor and General Ghalib al-Siklabi sabotaged the brother of Al-Hakam II who was set to succeed his brother and become the next Caliph of Cordoba. Still too young to rule, Hisham II handed the reins of power over to Almanzor in 981, who became the de facto leader of the Caliphate until his death in 1002. Al-Mansur ibn Abi Amir perpetuated his position as the omnipotent ruler in charge of the empire while he exiled Hisham II and essentially kept him prisoner for most of his reign as the third Caliph of Cordoba. With his countless successful campaigns against Christian powers in the Spanish North such as Barcelona in 985, León in 988, as well as a major strike on the church of St. James in the Galician city of Santiago de Compostela in 998, Almanzor is known for bringing the Caliphate of Córdoba to its apex of power in Islamic Iberian history.

In 1002, after the death of his father (Almanzor), Abd al-Malik (1002–1008) became the ruler of the Caliphate and led successful campaigns against Navarre and Barcelona. In 1008 Abd ur-Rahman Sanjul (1008–1009) is said to have poisoned his brother (Abd al-Malik al-Muzaffar) which led to his death in October 1008. In 1009, while Abd al-Rahman Sanchuelo was waging war against Alfonso V in León, Muhammad II al-Mahdi usurped the throne from Hisham II then held him hostage in Cordoba. In November of the same year, just months after initiating his control as the ruler of the Caliphate, Muhammad II al-Mahdi was overthrown by a primarily Berber army (that he had previously commanded, but by which he was later abandoned) which was led by Sulayman ibn al-Hakam in the battle of Alcolea. After the battle, Abd al-Malik al-Muzaffar was exiled to Toledo at which point Sulayman laid siege to Cordoba freeing Hisham II from the imprisonment that took place under the rule of Muhammad II al-Mahdi. Sulayman ibn al-Hakam was appointed to Caliph by his Berber army and maintained that position until Muhammad II al-Mahdi re-conquered the territory in May, 1010. Finally the Slavic troops of the Caliphate under al-Wahdid restored Hisham II as Caliph (1010–1013).

Hisham II was now under the influence of al-Wahdid, who was nevertheless unable to gain control of the Berber troops – these still supported Sulayman, and the civil war continued. In 1013 the Berbers took Cordoba with much plundering and destruction. What happened to Hisham after that is uncertain – supposedly he was killed on 19 April 1013 by the Berbers. In any case, Sulayman al-Mustaʿin (1013–1016) became Caliph.

Revival under the taifa kings
Due to his disappearance, and hence his possible survival, Hisham II was revived as a symbol of legitimacy by the taifa kings who appeared following the definitive collapse of the caliphate: in 1035, the ruler of the Taifa of Seville, Abu al-Qasim Muhammad ibn Abbad, announced that Hisham had reappeared, and declared his allegiance to him. Other taifas falling under Seville's sway during the following years followed suit. It was not until 1060 that the Sevillan ruler Abbad II al-Mu'tadid acknowledged that this supposed Hisham had died in 1044 without a successor, but the "convenient fiction" of his survival lasted until at least 1082–83, when his name still appears in the coins of the Taifa of Zaragoza.

See also

Jacob ibn Jau

References

Sources

External links
Al-Andalus: the art of Islamic Spain, an exhibition catalog from The Metropolitan Museum of Art (fully available online as PDF), which contains material on Hisham II (see index)

966 births
1013 deaths
10th-century caliphs of Córdoba
11th-century caliphs of Córdoba
LGBT royalty
LGBT Muslims
Medieval child monarchs
Medieval LGBT people
LGBT heads of state
Umayyad caliphs of Córdoba